Nabagram is a village in the Nabagram CD block in the Lalbag subdivision of Murshidabad district in the Indian state of West Bengal.

Geography

Location

Area overview
While the Lalbag subdivision is spread across both the natural physiographic regions of the district, Rarh and Bagri, the Domkal subdivision occupies the north-eastern corner of Bagri. In the map alongside, the Ganges/ Padma River flows along the northern portion. The border with Bangladesh can be seen in the north and the east. Murshidabad district shares with Bangladesh a porous international border which is notoriously crime prone (partly shown in this map). The Ganges has a tendency to change course frequently, causing severe erosion, mostly along the southern bank.The historic city of Murshidabad, a centre of major tourist attraction, is located in this area. In 1717, when Murshid Quli Khan became Subahdar, he made Murshidabad the capital of Subah Bangla (then Bengal, Bihar and Odisha).The entire area is overwhelmingly rural with over 90% of the population living in the rural areas.

Note: The map alongside presents some of the notable locations in the subdivisions. All places marked in the map are linked in the larger full screen map.

Civic administration

Police station
Nabagram police station has jurisdiction over Nabagram CD block.

CD block HQ
The headquarters of Nabagram CD block are located at Nabagram.

Demographics
According to the 2011 Census of India, Nabagram had a total population of 6,939 of which 3,535 (51%) were males and 3,404 (49%) were females. Population in the age range 0-6 years was 808. The total number of literate persons in Nabagram was 4,624 (75% of the population over 6 years).

Education
Nabagram Amar Chand Kundu College was established in 2009 at Nabagram. Affiliated with the University of Kalyani it offers courses in Bengali and history.

Healthcare
Nabagram Block Primary Health Centre functions with 15 beds at Nabagram.

References

Villages in Murshidabad district